Callianideidae is a family of crustaceans belonging to the infraorder Axiidea, within the order Decapoda.

It contains the following genera:
 Callianidea H.Milne Edwards, 1837
 Crosniera Kensley & Heard, 1991
 Heardaxius K.Sakai, 2011
 Mictaxius Kensley & Heard, 1991
 Paracallanidea Sakai, 1992
 Paracallianidea K.Sakai, 1992
 Thomassinia de Saint Laurent, 1979

References

Decapods